Christopher A. "Chris" Kojm is a professor at George Washington University. He served as the chairman of the United States National Intelligence Council from 2009 to 2014.

Biography
Kojm was valedictorian at Lancaster High School. Kojm went on to receive an AB from Harvard College in 1977 and an MA from the Woodrow Wilson School of Public and International Affairs at Princeton University in 1979. From 1979 to 1984 he was a senior editor at the Foreign Policy Association in New York City.

From 1984 to 1998 he was a staff member of the House Foreign Affairs Committee under Lee H. Hamilton, the ranking member, then chairman of the committee.

From 1998 to 2003, Kojm was Deputy Assistant Secretary for Intelligence Policy and Coordination in the State Department's Bureau of Intelligence and Research. He then served as  Deputy Director of the National Commission on Terrorist Attacks Upon the United States, later serving as president of the 9/11 Public Discourse Project.

Between 2004 and 2006, he was a Visiting Professor at his alma mater, the Woodrow Wilson School of Public and International Affairs. In 2006, he was a senior adviser to the Iraq Study Group. In 2007, he became a faculty member of the Elliott School of International Affairs at George Washington University, and returned to teach at the Elliott School in 2014.

In November 2020, Kojm was named a volunteer member of the Joe Biden presidential transition Agency Review Team to support transition efforts related to the United States Intelligence Community.

References

External links

Living people
George Washington University faculty
Harvard College alumni
Princeton School of Public and International Affairs alumni
People from Kenmore, New York
1955 births